Klein Independent School District (Klein ISD) is a school district that covers  in Harris County, Texas, United States. It became an independent school district in 1938. Almost all of the territory is unincorporated; a small portion of Houston is within the district. In the 2020–2021 school year, Klein ISD had 52,824 students. Klein ISD is part of the taxation base for the Lone Star College System. , Jenny McGown is Superintendent of Schools.

The district has 33 elementary schools (including a Pre-K designated school), ten intermediate schools, and five high schools. For the 2018–2019 school year, the district received a score of 89 out of 100 from the Texas Education Agency.

History
Rural High School District No. 1 was formed in July 1928 as a result of the consolidation of five common school districts, including  French School, the schools of Hildebrandt, Oak Grove, Willow Creek, Kothman, Harrel, Fuchs, and the Kohrville School for black children. The district became Klein Independent School District in 1938, named after Adam Klein, who led many German immigrants into the area in 1854. It is board policy that all high schools include the name 'Klein' in honor of the district's namesake. After Klein High School's current building was constructed in 1963, the original Klein High was used as the administration building. The current Klein ISD Central Office building opened in 1981.

In 1971, Donald Collins became the district's superintendent and served until his retirement in 2000. Under his tenure, the number of schools in the district rose from 6 to 28. In 2001, Klein Collins High School was named in his honor.

Jim Cain served as superintendent from 2004 to 2016. Formerly a director of school administration in Klein ISD before moving to Fort Bend ISD, Dr. Cain returned to Klein and worked as the assistant/associate superintendent for administration. In 2017, Klein Cain High School was named after him.

Communities 
Klein ISD serves unincorporated portions of northern Harris County, Texas, and includes the communities and neighborhoods of Klein, Kohrville, Louetta, and parts of North Houston. Some areas within the Spring and Tomball postal designations, and a portion of "Acres Homes" within the city limits of Houston are also served by Klein ISD.

The Klein ISD Board of Trustees passed a resolution at their January 2016 meeting regarding renaming the 88 square miles encompassing Klein ISD as Klein, Tx. The resolution includes the following: 
 Recommends that residents living within the district boundaries refer to their community as Klein, Texas; 
 Recommends that citizens within zip codes 77379, 77389 and 77391 use Klein, Texas as their address; and
 Directs that all Klein ISD buildings and facilities be identified as being in Klein, Texas. 
By Texas legislative action in 1977, the area inside the boundaries of the Klein ISD was designated as Klein, Texas.

Students

Academics

For each school year, the Texas Education Agency rates school district performance based on statistical data. Beginning in 2017–2018, the agency calculates a score for each district from 0 to 100 which is used to assign a grade from A to F. School districts did not receive a score or rating for 2019–2020 or for 2020–2021 due to the COVID-19 pandemic. For the 2018–2019 school year, Klein ISD received an overall score of 89, resulting in a B grade. The district received a score of 85 and a B grade in 2017–2018.

From 2013 to 2017, the agency rated school districts as either Met Standard, Met Alternative Standard, or Improvement Required. Klein ISD received a Met Standard rating for each year under this system. School districts did not receive a rating for the 2011–2012 school year as the agency transitioned from using the Texas Assessment of Knowledge and Skills (TAKS) to the State of Texas Assessments of Academic Readiness (STAAR) as the basis for their accountability ratings.

From 1996 to 2011, the agency rated school districts as either Exemplary, Recognized, Academically Acceptable, or Academically Unacceptable. From 2004 to 2008, the district was rated Academically Acceptable, and from 2009 to 2011, the district received a Recognized rating. School districts did not receive a rating for the 2002–2003 school year as the agency transitioned from using the Texas Assessment of Academic Skills (TAAS) to the TAKS standardized test. The district was rated Academically Acceptable from 1996 to 2001 and Recognized in 2002.

On January 18, 2019, Klein ISD was a finalist for the H-E-B Excellence in Education Award.

Demographics
In the 2020–2021 school year, the district had a total of 52,824 students, starting from early childhood/pre-kindergarten education through grade 12. The district had 3,617.09 teachers and 3,274.48 additional staff for a total of 6,891.57 employees on a full-time equivalent basis. The district's student to teacher ratio was 14.60. The ethnic distribution of students was:
 15.6% African American
 8.2% Asian
 43.3% Hispanic
 0.4% American Indian
 0.1% Pacific Islander
 3.7% Two or More Races
 28.7% White

49.5% of students were listed as economically disadvantaged, 17.6% were English-language learners, and 11.1% received special education services.

Klein ISD's student enrollment has increased significantly across multiple decades. In the 2017–2018 school year, there were 52,896 students enrolled. There were 44,695 students in 2009–2010, and 35,474 students in 2003–2004.

Bonds 
Klein ISD, with voter approval, has sold bonds in 2004, 2008, and 2015 to provide funding for large infrastructure projects. The 2004 bond referendum approved the sale of $224 million and included renovations of existing buildings and the construction of Vistas High School and Benignus Elementary School. All projects associated with the 2004 bond started in 2005 and have been completed. On May 10, 2008, a bond referendum for $646.9 million was passed with approximately 52% (4,732 of 9,152) of the ballots for it. The bond was to create new schools, including Blackshear Elementary, Bernshausen Elementary, and Klein Cain High School. In May 2015, Klein ISD held another bond referendum for $498.1 million, which passed with around 77% (4,571 of 6,033) of the ballots for it. The bond apportioned $283.6 million for construction projects, including $121.9 million to supplement 2008 bond funding for Klein Cain High School, $47.1 million for Hofius Intermediate, and $26.2 million for Fox Elementary. Other bond projects were classroom additions, security upgrades, technology infrastructure, and facility renovations. Bonds from the 2015 referendum were sold in bundles from 2015 to 2020. The district completed construction of Klein Cain High School in 2017 and Hofius Intermediate in 2018. Some classroom additions and renovations were removed from the 2015 bond project and the funds were used to repair facilities damaged by flooding. In May 2022 for the 2022 bond, "Klein ISD voters made district history as they approved $895,350,000 million in bond funding."

Curriculum
Klein ISD generally offers uniform curriculum across all its elementary schools, intermediate schools, and high schools.

College classes
The Klein district offers Dual Credit (DC) courses in which high school teachers who teach these courses are also college professors. These students earn both high school credit and college credit, while staying at their high school. Klein ISD also has a partnership with Lone Star College in which students can also take classes at Lone Star College–University Park, earning from three to 57 college credit hours. Dual credit courses offered in the district include English 3, English 4, U.S. History, U.S. Government, Art History, Independent Study/Math, Pre-Calculus, Biology, Anatomy & Physiology, Correctional Services, and Court Systems & Practices.

Klein ISD also offers many Advanced Placement (AP) classes at all five of their high schools in math, science, English, social studies, fine arts, and foreign language courses. Students who enroll in the course (approved by College Board) may receive college credit by receiving a passing score on an exam taken at the end of the year. At the middle school and high school level, Pre-AP classes are offered in all schools to prepare students for future AP courses.

The district offers the International Baccalaureate Diploma Program (IB) for 11th and 12th grade students at Klein Oak High School. The program accepts applications from any student in Klein ISD. Students must complete courses within each of the six IB subjects, write an essay based on independent research, complete the Theory of Knowledge course, and complete either a service, activity, or creative project.

Fine arts
Klein ISD offers fine arts courses in band, choir, dance, elementary music, orchestra, theatre art, and visual art. The district was listed as one of the 2020 Best Communities for Music Education awarded by the National Association of Music Merchants Foundation. The district was designated a 2019 District of Distinction by the Texas Art Education Association.

STEAM education
Klein ISD operates the STEAM (the Science, Technology, Engineering, Arts with Math) Express, a bus that travels around the district with a drop down stage, teaching students about STEAM careers through a variety of activities. In 2019–2020, the bus visited 8094 students, 560 educators, and 270 members of the community.

Schools

Current campuses
In Klein ISD, grades pre-kindergarten through grade 5 are considered a part of elementary school, grades 6 through 8 are in intermediate school, and grades 9 through 12 a part of high school. The district also offers a Pre-Kindergarten campus for certain areas of the district for students who have not yet entered elementary school. Additionally, Klein ISD offers the Vistas High School Program for high school students who are at risk for not graduating. The program is offered to all Klein ISD high school students who are admitted based on an application and interview process. For the 2020–2021 school year, Klein ISD operated 33 elementary schools, ten intermediate schools, and five high schools.

Klein ISD creates attendance zones for neighborhoods within the boundaries of the district. All neighborhoods are zoned to a specific elementary school, intermediate school, and high school. When a new school opens, or a school becomes overcrowded, the district begins realigning and rezoning certain neighborhoods to ensure that there is balance among all schools. Students must attend the assigned schools for their neighborhood, with the exception of students who attend the International Baccalaureate program at Klein Oak High School.

High schools
Klein High School was the first high school constructed in the Klein district, built in its current location in 1963 with renovations completed in 2014. For the 2018–2019 school year, there were 3,433 students enrolled. The school received a B grade from the Texas Education Agency. The principal is Brandon Baker, and the mascot is the Bearkat.
Klein Forest High School was the second high school built in Klein ISD in 1979 and enrolled 3,566 students in 2018–2019. The school received a C grade from the Texas Education Agency. The current principal is Lance Alexander and the mascot is the Golden Eagle.
Klein Oak High School was the third high school built in 1982 and enrolled 3,698 students in 2018–2019. The school received a B grade from the Texas Education Agency. It is the only school in the Klein district that offers the International Baccalaureate program. The current principal is Thomas Hensley and the mascot is the Panther.
Klein Collins High School was the fourth high school built in 2001 and enrolled 3,470 students in 2018–2019. The school received a B grade from the Texas Education Agency. The high school was named after Don Collins, a former superintendent of Klein ISD. The current principal of the high school is Randy Kirk and the mascot is the Tiger.
Klein Cain High School is the fifth and newest high school, built in 2017. The high school was named after Dr. Jim Cain, a former superintendent who retired in 2015. In its first year, Klein Cain enrolled only ninth and tenth grade students. The school added 11th grade students in 2018–19, and will operate as a full 9–12 high school beginning in 2019–2020. The school enrolled 2,323 students in 2018–2019 and received a B grade from the Texas Education Agency. The current principal is Nicole Patin and the mascot is the Ibis.

Intermediate schools 

Doerre Intermediate School
Hildebrandt Intermediate School
Hofius Intermediate School
Kleb Intermediate School
Klein Intermediate School
Krimmel Intermediate School
Schindewolf Intermediate School
Strack Intermediate School
Ulrich Intermediate School
Wunderlich Intermediate School

Elementary schools 

Benfer Elementary School
Benignus Elementary School
Bernshausen Elementary School
Blackshear Elementary School
Brill Elementary School
Ehrhardt Elementary School
Eiland Elementary School
Epps Island Elementary School
Grace England Elementary School
Fox Elementary School
Frank Elementary School
French Elementary School
Greenwood Forest Elementary School
Hassler Elementary School
Haude Elementary School
Kaiser Elementary School
Klenk Elementary School
Kohrville Elementary School
Krahn Elementary School
Kreinhop Elementary School
Kuehnle Elementary School
Lemm Elementary School
Mahaffey Elementary School
McDougle Elementary School
Metzler Elementary School
Mittelstädt Elementary School
Mueller Elementary School
Nitsch Elementary School
Northampton Elementary School
Roth Elementary School
Schultz Elementary School
Theiss Elementary School
Zwink Elementary School

Other campuses 
Klein Alternative Education Center
Klein ISD Therapeutic & Readiness Center

Former campuses 
Klein Intermediate School: Situated next to what is currently Klein High School, the original Klein Intermediate, not to be confused with the existing one, opened in 1967. It became the Klein HS ninth grade building in 1975, and later became Kleb Intermediate School, again not to be confused with the existing one, in 1981. Beginning in 1993 it served as the Klein Annex, an alternative education facility for students with persistent and serious behavior issues. It was torn down and its functions moved to a new building on an adjacent site, while the site of the original building became playing fields.
Klein Elementary School: Located next to the original Klein High School on Spring Cypress Road, Klein Elementary School opened in 1940 and was renamed Klein Middle School in 1971. The building was demolished in 2007 due to safety concerns. A new building was constructed on the site which became the Network Operations Center.
Garden City Elementary School: Located on W. Montgomery Road just south of the present day Nitsch Elementary School, this school opened in 1956 and closed in the 1970s.
Recreation Acres Elementary School: This school served southern part of district and opened in 1949.
Kohrville School: Located at the present-day corner of Spring-Cypress and Huffsmith-Kohrville Road, the school opened in 1895 and served as the district's  black school during the period of de jure segregation. In 1928, the school was combined with Rural High School #1. The school re-opened in a new facility in 1949 and operated until the district integrated its schools in 1967. The former school served as a community center for several years before being converted into a museum.

See also

List of school districts in Texas

References

External links

 Official site
 Klein ISD Education Foundation

 
School districts in Harris County, Texas
School districts in Houston
1938 establishments in Texas
School districts established in 1938